Feras Zeyad Yousef Shelbaieh (born November 27, 1993) is a Jordanian football player who currently plays as a right back for Al-Wehdat club and the Jordan national football team.

International career
Shelbaieh played his first international match against Lebanon in an international friendly in Amman on 15 November 2016, which Jordan drawn 0-0.

International career statistics

International goals
Scores and results list Jordan's goal tally first.

References

External links 
 kooora.com
 flashscore.ae
 whoscored.com
 
 

Living people
Jordan international footballers
1993 births
Jordanian footballers
Sportspeople from Amman
Al-Wehdat SC players
Al-Jazeera (Jordan) players
Association football fullbacks
2019 AFC Asian Cup players